The Tongan whistler (Pachycephala jacquinoti) is a species of bird in the family Pachycephalidae. It is endemic to the islands of Vava'u and Late in Tonga. It is mainly found in tropical primary forest, but can sometimes be seen in second growth or wooded plantations. It is similar to the Australian golden whistler in appearance, but the head and throat of the male is entirely black, and the underparts of the female are yellow. The Tongan whistler is threatened by habitat loss. The Tongan whistler was also described by Jacques Pucheran in the genus Eopsaltria and has been variably considered as a subspecies of the golden whistler.

References

Tongan whistler
Birds of Tonga
Endemic fauna of Tonga
Tongan whistler
Tongan whistler
Taxonomy articles created by Polbot